For the unrelated U.S. film adaptation of the 1977 Broadway theatre musical, see Annie (1982 film)

Annie is a 1976 film directed by Massimo Dallamano and starring Annie Belle. The film is approximately 86 minutes long and was released in Italy on 19 February 1976. The plot is about a mistress in Hong Kong.

Premise
Annie, the mistress of a middle-aged financier, accompanies him on a trip to Hong Kong. When his business interests collapse Annie ends up destitute. She is befriended by a group of socialites and begins her rite of passage in their world.

References

External links
Annie at IMDb

1976 films
Films set in Hong Kong
British drama films
1970s English-language films
Italian drama films
1970s British films
1970s Italian films